This is a list of 178 species in Exechia, a genus of fungus gnats in the family Mycetophilidae.

Exechia species

 Exechia abbreviata (Skuse, 1888) c g
 Exechia abrupta Johannsen, 1912 i c g
 Exechia absoluta Johannsen, 1912 i c g
 Exechia absurda Johannsen, 1912 i c g
 Exechia accisa Wu & Zheng, 2001 c g
 Exechia adamsi Laffoon, 1965 i c g
 Exechia adenaparva Chandler, 2000 c g
 Exechia aequalis Van Duzee, 1928 i c g
 Exechia aitkeni (Lane, 1960) c
 Exechia albicincta Senior-White, 1922 c g
 Exechia alexanderi Shaw, 1951 i c g
 Exechia ampullata Senior-White, 1921 c g
 Exechia angustata Van Duzee, 1928 i c g
 Exechia areolata (Enderlein, 1910) c g
 Exechia argenteofasciata Senior-White, 1921 c g
 Exechia arisaemae Sasakawa, 1993 c g
 Exechia assidua Johannsen, 1912 i c g
 Exechia atridonta Wu, Xu & Yu, 2004 c g
 Exechia attrita Johannsen, 1912 i c g
 Exechia auxiliaria Johannsen, 1912 i c g
 Exechia aviculata Shaw, 1935 i c g
 Exechia basilinea Brunetti, 1912 c g
 Exechia bella Johannsen, 1912 i c g
 Exechia bellula Johannsen, 1912 i c g
 Exechia bicincta (Staeger, 1840) i c g
 Exechia bifida (Freeman, 1951) c g
 Exechia bifurcata Fisher, 1934 i c g
 Exechia bilobata Shaw, 1951 i c g
 Exechia biseta Tonnoir & Edwards, 1927 c g
 Exechia borealis Van Duzee, 1928 i c g
 Exechia brevicornis Senior-White, 1922 c g
 Exechia brevifurcata (Freeman, 1951) c g
 Exechia brevipetiolata Van Duzee, 1928 i c g
 Exechia brinckiana Nielsen, 1966 c g
 Exechia canalicula Johannsen, 1912 i c g
 Exechia capillata Johannsen, 1912 i c g
 Exechia captiva Johannsen, 1912 i c g
 Exechia chandleri Caspers, 1987 c g
 Exechia changbaiensis Wu & Zheng, 2001 c g
 Exechia cincinnata Johannsen, 1912 i c g b
 Exechia cincta Winnertz, 1863 c g
 Exechia cingulata (Meigen, 1830) c g
 Exechia clepsydra Fisher, 1937 i c g
 Exechia concinna Winnertz, 1863 c g
 Exechia confinis Winnertz, 1863 c g
 Exechia contaminata Winnertz, 1863 i c g
 Exechia cornuta Lundstrom, 1914 c g
 Exechia cristata Senior-White, 1921 c g
 Exechia cristatoides Senior-White, 1924 c g
 Exechia dahli Nielsen, 1966 c g
 Exechia dizona Edwards, 1924 c g
 Exechia dorsalis (Staeger, 1840) c g
 Exechia emarginata Zaitzev, 1988 c g
 Exechia exigua Lundstrom, 1909 c g
 Exechia extensa (Freeman, 1951) c g
 Exechia fascipennis (Skuse, 1890) c g
 Exechia festiva Winnertz, 1863 c g
 Exechia filata Tonnoir & Edwards, 1927 c g
 Exechia flabellipennis (Enderlein, 1910) c g
 Exechia flava Senior-White, 1922 c g
 Exechia frigida (Boheman, 1865) i c g
 Exechia fulva Santos Abreu, 1920 c g
 Exechia fumosa (Skuse, 1888) c g
 Exechia funerea (Freeman, 1951) c g
 Exechia furcilla (Freeman, 1954) c g
 Exechia fusca (Meigen, 1804) i c g
 Exechia goianensis (Lane, 1947) c
 Exechia gracile (Kertesz, 1901) c g
 Exechia gracilis Bukowski, 1949 c g
 Exechia hebetata Wu, Xu & Yu, 2004 c g
 Exechia hei Wu, Xu & Yu, 2004 c g
 Exechia hiemalis (Marshall, 1896) c g
 Exechia howesi Tonnoir & Edwards, 1927 c g
 Exechia inaperta Ostroverkhova, 1979 c g
 Exechia insularis Sasakawa, 1992 c g
 Exechia intermedia Santos Abreu, 1920 c g
 Exechia kunashirensis Zaitzev, 1996 c g
 Exechia longichaeta Wu, Xu & Yu, 2004 c g
 Exechia longicornisma Senior-White, 1922 c g
 Exechia lucidula (Zetterstedt, 1838) c g
 Exechia lundstroemi Landrock, 1923 i c g
 Exechia lutacea Edwards, 1928 c g
 Exechia lydiae Matile, 1979 c g
 Exechia macrura Strobl, 1910 c g
 Exechia macula Chandler, 2001 c g
 Exechia maculipennis (Stannius, 1831) c g
 Exechia mastigura Edwards, 1928 c g
 Exechia melasa Wu & Zheng, 2001 c g
 Exechia micans Lastrovak & Matile, 1974 c g
 Exechia mirastoma Senior-White, 1922 c g
 Exechia nativa Johannsen, 1912 i c g
 Exechia nexa Johannsen, 1912 i c g
 Exechia nigra Edwards, 1925 c g
 Exechia nigrofusca Lundstrom, 1909 c g
 Exechia nigroscutellata Landrock, 1912 c g
 Exechia nitidicollis Lundstrom, 1913 i c g
 Exechia noctivaga Van Duzee, 1928 i c g
 Exechia novaezelandiae Tonnoir & Edwards, 1927 c g
 Exechia nugatoria Johannsen, 1912 i c g
 Exechia obediens Johannsen, 1912 i c g
 Exechia pallidula Edwards, 1926 c g
 Exechia palmata Johannsen, 1912 i c g
 Exechia papyracea Stackelberg, 1948 c g
 Exechia paramirastoma Senior-White, 1922 c g
 Exechia pararepanda Kallweit, 1995 c g
 Exechia parava Lundstrom, 1909 c g
 Exechia parva Lundström, 1909 g
 Exechia parvula (Zetterstedt, 1852) c g
 Exechia paulistensis (Lane, 1947) c
 Exechia pavani Tollet, 1959 c g
 Exechia pectinata Ostroverkhova, 1979 c g
 Exechia pectinivalva Stackelberg, 1948 c g
 Exechia pedekiboana Lindner, 1958 c g
 Exechia perspicua Johannsen, 1912 i
 Exechia peyerimhoffi Burghele, 1966 c g
 Exechia pictiventris (Skuse, 1888) c g
 Exechia pilifera Matile, 1979 c g
 Exechia plebeia (Walker, 1848) i c g
 Exechia pollex Shaw, 1935 i c g
 Exechia praedita Plassmann, 1976 c g
 Exechia pratti Shaw, 1951 i c g
 Exechia pseudocincta Strobl, 1910 c g
 Exechia pseudocontaminata Santos Abreu, 1920 c g
 Exechia pseudofestiva Lackschewitz, 1937 c g
 Exechia pulchrigaster Santos Abreu, 1920 c g
 Exechia pullata Ostroverkhova, 1979 c g
 Exechia pullicauda (Skuse, 1888) c g
 Exechia quadrata Johannsen, 1912 i c g
 Exechia quadriclema Wu & Zheng, 2001 c g
 Exechia repanda Johannsen, 1912 i c g
 Exechia repandoides Caspers, 1984 c g
 Exechia rohdendorfi Zaitzev, 1996 c g
 Exechia rubella Santos Abreu, 1920 c g
 Exechia rufithorax Wulp, 1874 c g
 Exechia satiata Johannsen, 1912 i c g
 Exechia scalprifer Edwards, 1928 c g
 Exechia seducta Plassmann, 1976 c g
 Exechia semifumata (Brunetti, 1912) c g
 Exechia separata Lundstrom, 1912 c g
 Exechia seriata (Meigen, 1830) c g
 Exechia serrata Winnertz, 1863 c g
 Exechia setigera (Freeman, 1951) c g
 Exechia setosa Matile, 1979 c g
 Exechia shawi Fisher, 1934 i c g
 Exechia shitiakevora Okada, 1939 c g
 Exechia sibirica Ostroverkhova, 1979 c g
 Exechia similis Lastovka & Matile, 1974 c g
 Exechia simplex (Brunetti, 1912) c g
 Exechia snyderi Colless, 1966 c g
 Exechia solii Zaitzev, 1999 c g
 Exechia sororcula Lackschewitz, 1937 c g
 Exechia speciosa Winnertz, 1863 c g
 Exechia spinadhalae Chandler, 2000 c g
 Exechia spinigera Winnertz, 1863 c g
 Exechia spinuligera Lundstrom, 1912 c g
 Exechia styriaca Strobl, 1898 c g
 Exechia subcornuta Zaitzev, 1996 c g
 Exechia subfrigida Lastovka & Matile, 1974 c g
 Exechia subligulata Shaw, 1952 i c g
 Exechia subspinigera Zaitzev, 1988 c g
 Exechia subvenosa (Enderlein, 1910) c g
 Exechia tajimaensis Okada, 1940 c g
 Exechia tenuimaculata Santos Abreu, 1920 c g
 Exechia thomsoni Miller, 1918 c g
 Exechia tomosa Wu & Zheng, 2001 c g
 Exechia tricincta (Enderlein, 1910) c g
 Exechia triseta Ostroverkhova, 1979 c g
 Exechia trispinosa Zaitzev, 1996 c g
 Exechia truncata (Freeman, 1951) c
 Exechia turkmenica Zaitzev, 1994 c g
 Exechia umbratica (Aldrich, 1897) i c g
 Exechia umbrosa Van Duzee, 1928 i c g
 Exechia unicincta Van Duzee, 1928 i c g
 Exechia unicolor Van Duzee, 1928 i c g
 Exechia unifasciata Lackschewitz, 1937 c g
 Exechia unimaculata (Zetterstedt, 1860) c g
 Exechia ussuriensis Zaitzev, 1994 c g
 Exechia zeylanica Senior-White, 1921 c g

Data sources: i = ITIS, c = Catalogue of Life, g = GBIF, b = Bugguide.net

References

Exechia
Articles created by Qbugbot